The 2010–11 Andebol 1 was the 60th season of Portuguese premier handball league. It ran from 11 September 2010 to 22 May 2011. Porto won their sixteenth title and the third consecutive season.

Teams

The 12 teams contesting the 2010–11 Andebol 1 season were:

League table

First Group

Second Round

Group A - Champion

Group B - Relegation

Top Three Goalscorers

Notes

References

Handball in Portugal
2010–11 domestic handball leagues
2010 in Portuguese sport
2011 in Portuguese sport